is the first studio album, second album overall, by the Japanese idol group AKB48. It was released in Japan on April 7, 2010, and contains 16 songs, 14 of which had been previously released as singles. The album topped the weekly Oricon Albums Chart.

Release

The regular edition was released by King Records as a CD+DVD. The CD features 16 music tracks and the DVD has four video clips, three of which are choreography videos. In Japan, the album came with a photo of one of the 12 cover girls.

A theater edition was also released by King Records. It consists of 14 of the 16 music tracks. Instead of the DVD, there is a bonus CD with an audio commentary by the group on the 14 songs. It is packaged with an autograph signing ticket event held at Makuhari Messe International Exhibition Hall.

Track listing 
All songs performed by the AKB48 title track singers except as listed below.

Charts

Sales and certifications

Release history

Notes

References

External links 
 Oricon profile 

2010 debut albums
AKB48 albums
King Records (Japan) albums